Events from the year 1917 in Sweden

Incumbents
 Monarch – Gustaf V
 Prime Minister - Hjalmar Hammarskjöld, Carl Swartz, and Nils Edén

Events
 10–18 February – The Nordic Games take place in Stockholm.
 1 and 16 September: The 1917 Swedish general election result in the fall of the rightwing government in favor of the liberals.
 The child serial killer Hilda Nilsson is put on trial. 
 The movie A Man There Was has its premier

Births

 3 February – Arne Sucksdorff, film director  (died 2001)

Deaths

 14 July – Paul Peter Waldenström, theologian  (born 1838)
 10 August - Hilda Nilsson, serial killer  (born 1876)
 5 November - Louise Hammarström, chemist  (born 1849)
 Wilhelmina Lagerholm, photographer  (born 1826)
 Sophie Cysch, singer (born 1847)

References

 
Years of the 20th century in Sweden
Sweden